Dabjani is an abandoned village in the municipality of Dolneni, North Macedonia. At the start of the 20th century, this village had 130 inhabitants.

Demographics
According to the 2002 census, the village had no permanent inhabitants.

References

Villages in Dolneni Municipality